John B. Aird was a self-discharging lake freighter/bulk carrier that was launched in 1983 and served on the Great Lakes and Saint Lawrence Seaway until 2017. The vessel was owned and operated by Algoma Central during that time, which had named the vessel for a former chairman of the Algoma Central Railway.

Description
The vessel had a gross tonnage (GT) of 22,881 and a deadweight tonnage of 30,958. The ship was equipped with a  deck-mounted boom for unloading its cargo.

Service history
Algoma Central ordered the ship to be constructed at Collingwood Shipbuilding in Collingwood, Ontario with the yard number 224. The fore part of the ship was built at Port Arthur Shipbuilding in Port Arthur, Ontario. The stern section was launched at Collingwood on 21 October 1982 and towed to Port Arthur. The two parts were joined at Port Arthur and the vessel was launched on 18 December 1982. The ship was named for the then current Lieutenant Governor of Ontario John Black Aird, who was a former chairman of the board of Algoma Central Railway. The bulk carrier was completed in June 1983 and christened by the wife of the lieutenant governor in a private ceremony, after an incident aboard the ship prior to a public ceremony on 3 June 1983. The vessel was registered in Sault Ste. Marie, Ontario.

On 31 May 1985, John B. Aird lost power in the Saint Lawrence Seaway and was forced to tie up at the Snell Lock. The vessel often carried coal and suffered $500,000 damage from a coal fire in her self-unloading machinery on 16 October 1990 while at Indiana Harbor, Indiana. The vessel was taken to Sarnia, Ontario for repairs. The vessel returned to service in November 1990. The vessel was sold for scrap in 2017 and the vessel's name shortened to John B. and re-registered to Freetown, Sierra Leone. The ship arrived at Aliağa, Turkey to be broken up in May and destruction was finished on 14 June 2017.

References

Sources

 

Algoma Central Marine
Great Lakes freighters
1982 ships
Ships built in Collingwood, Ontario